Sefako Makgatho Health Sciences University (SMU or MEDUNSA) is a university in Ga-Rankuwa, Gauteng Province, South Africa. Its current incarnation was formed on 1 January 2015. Previously it was known as Medical University of South Africa (MEDUNSA) and later as a campus of the University of Limpopo. It is named after South African ANC leader Sefako Makgatho. Since its name-change, students have colloquially referred to the institution using the acronym of its current name ("SMU") in a similar fashion to manner in which they used the acronym "MEDUNSA" to refer to the institution prior to the change of name.

History 
The Medical University of South Africa (MEDUNSA) was established in 1976 to provide medical education to black students, who were restricted from attending most medical schools in South Africa by the Apartheid government, with a few exceptions at segregated non-white-only medical schools.

The seat of the university is located at Ga-Rankuwa. The name change from MEDUNSA to Sefako Makgatho Health Sciences University (SMU) was one of the causes of the riots in August 2014. From 2005 to 2015, the university was a campus of the University of Limpopo, but it was separated following a review of the merger. The launch on 14 April 2015 was attended by President Jacob Zuma and Minister of Higher Education Blade Nzimande, with the president delivering the keynote address.

Degree programmes 
The following degree programmes are offered:

School of Medicine 
Bachelor of Medicine and Bachelor of Surgery (MBChB) (incl. ECP)

Master of Medicine – MMed (in various specialisations)

Master of Science in Clinical Psychology (MSc Clinical Psychology)

Doctor of Medicine (MD in General Surgery)

PhD (in various specialisations)

Bachelor of Diagnostic Radiography (BRad Diag)

School of Oral Health 
Bachelor of Dental Sciences (BDS)

Master of Dentistry (MDent) (various specialisations)

PhD in Dentistry

Bachelor of Dental Therapy (BDT)

Bachelor of Oral Hygiene (BOH)

School of Pharmacy 
Bachelor of Pharmacy (BPharm)

Master of Pharmacy (MPharm)

PhD in Pharmacy (PharmD)

Postgraduate Diploma (Hospital Pharmacy Management)

School of Health Care Sciences

Department of Nursing Sciences 
Baccalaureus Curationis (BCur) (I et A)

Bachelor of Nursing Science Honours (in various specialisations)

Master of Nursing Science (in various specialisations)

PhD in Nursing Sciences

Diploma in Occupational Health Nursing

Advanced Diploma in Occupational Health Nursing

Department of Human Nutrition and Dietetics 
Bachelor of Science in Dietetics

Masters of Science in Dietetics

PhD in Dietetics

Department of Occupational Therapy 
Bachelor of Occupational Therapy

Masters of Occupational Therapy

PhD in Occupational Therapy

Department of Physiotherapy 
Bachelor of Science in Physiotherapy

Master of Science in Physiotherapy (in various specialization)

PhD in Physiotherapy

Department of Speech Language Pathology and Audiology 
Bachelor of Speech-Language Pathology and Audiology

School of Science and Technology 
Bachelor of Science, majoring in:
Chemistry, Computer Science, Physiology, Psychology, Biology, Biochemistry, Physics, Mathematics and Applied Mathematics, Statistics

Extended Curriculum Programme (ECP) 4 years

Bachelor of Science Honours

Masters of Science

PhD.

References

External links 
 

 
Universities in Limpopo
Universities in Gauteng
Public universities in South Africa
Educational institutions established in 2015
2015 establishments in South Africa